Willemijn Verkaik (born 16 June 1975) is a Dutch singer and actress. She is best known for her stage roles in Wicked and Elisabeth, and for providing the singing voice for Elsa in both the German and Dutch versions of Disney's Frozen. She was the longest running Elphaba in the musical Wicked, having played the role over 2,000 times, and is the only person to have played the role in three languages. Her first performance as Elphaba was on 31 October 2007, in Stuttgart, Germany, and her final performance was on 22 July 2017 in the West End of London.

Early life
Verkaik was born in Son en Breugel, Netherlands, on 16 June 1975, and grew up in Nuenen near Eindhoven. She graduated from the Rotterdam Conservatory.

Career
Before her acting career began, Verkaik sang in various pop bands for over ten years. Her first professional theatre role was that of an ensemble member in the Dutch production of Elisabeth.

In 2004, Verkaik recorded the singing voice of Erica in the Dutch version of the animated movie Barbie as the Princess and the Pauper. In 2008, she was the Dutch voice of Lydia in Barbie & the Diamond Castle.

Since then, her musical theatre credits have included Elisabeth (in Holland and Thun, Switzerland), The Three Musketeers, We Will Rock You, and most notably, Wicked, in which she was chosen as the "Wicked Personality of the Year" in 2010, out of all the actresses who had played the role, in an online poll with over 16,000 voters. Verkaik is the only actress in the world to play Elphaba in three languages: she has performed in the German, Dutch, Broadway, and West End productions.

Verkaik originated the role of Elphaba in the original German-language production of Wicked, which was entitled "Wicked: Die Hexen Von Oz", and began performances in Stuttgart on 1 November 2007, prior to an official opening night on November 15. Sabrina Weckerlin was her original alternate, appearing in the two shows a week in which Verkaik was not contracted to perform.

Verkaik soon repeated her performance in the Dutch-language production, which premiered in Scheveningen on 6 November 2011, after previews from 26 October. This required her to learn the role in her native language. The run ended on 11 January 2013 and Verkaik then transferred to North America, making her Broadway debut in the English-speaking New York company of Wicked and marking her third language production. Verkaik played a limited 15-week engagement at the Gershwin Theatre from 12 February 2013 to 26 May 2013.

Verkaik subsequently played the role of Donna in the Stuttgart production of Mamma Mia! for a limited run starting 26 July 2013, before playing the role of Elphaba again. Beginning on 18 November 2013, she made her West End debut in Wicked at the Apollo Victoria Theatre, London. Due to health reasons, Verkaik had to depart early from the West End production of Wicked on 19 July 2014, and was replaced by original cast member Kerry Ellis.

She can be heard on Wicked'''s German-language cast recording, as well as Scott Alan's album What I Wanna Be When I Grow Up and on the Scott Alan album LIVE, which was recorded at the Birdland jazz club in New York City on 30 April 2012. The CD was released on 26 June 2012.

Verkaik also provided the Dutch-speaking and singing voice and the German singing voice of Elsa, the Snow Queen in Disney's 2013 animated movie Frozen (the German-speaking voice was provided by Dina Kürten). She also performed the song "Let It Go" in English at the UK premiere of the movie.

It was announced on 24 October 2014 that Verkaik would be joining the cast of the musical, Women on the Verge of a Nervous Breakdown, alongside Tasmin Greig, Ricardo Afonso, Hadyn Gwynne, Jérôme Pradon and Anna Skellern, in the role of Paulina. The show's previews started on 16 December 2014 at the West End's Playhouse Theatre with an opening night on 12 January 2015. The show ran until 23 May 2015. This was Verkaik's first role after her surgery in 2014.

It was announced on 14 July 2015 that Verkaik would be returning to Stuttgart as Kala in Tarzan in August 2015, at the Stage Apollo Theater.

On 14 September 2016, it was revealed that Verkaik would return to her starring role of Elphaba in the West End production of Wicked beginning 30 January 2017 as part of the production's 10th-anniversary celebrations. She played her final performance on 22 July 2017 and was succeeded by Alice Fearn. Verkaik confirmed in her speech at the end of her final performance that, after 10 years, it was her last ever performance as Elphaba.

On 10 September 2017 it was announced that Verkaik would star in Ghost – Das Musical in Berlin from 7 December 2017 to 7 October 2018, in the role of Molly.

She next appeared as Sloane in the Metronom Theater production of Bat Out of Hell from 8 November 2018 to 30 March 2019, with previews starting from 2 November.

She then played Pepa in the Amsterdam production of Women on the Verge of a Nervous Breakdown from 4 July 2019 to 14 July 2019.

She toured the Netherlands playing Miss Hannigan in Annie from 26 November 2019 to 24 May 2020, with previews starting 5 November in Hoorn.

On 14 November 2019, it was announced that she will play the lead role of Jenna in Waitress in the Netherlands in 2020–2021.

On 9 February 2020, Verkaik was called in to join American actress and singer Idina Menzel, Aurora and eight more of Elsa's international dubbers to perform the song "Into the Unknown" during the 92nd Academy Awards. Every international performer sang one line of the song in a different language: Maria Lucia Heiberg Rosenberg in Danish, Verkaik in German, Takako Matsu in Japanese, Carmen Sarahí in Latin American Spanish, Lisa Stokke in Norwegian, Kasia Łaska in Polish, Anna Buturlina in Russian, Gisela in European Spanish and Gam Wichayanee in Thai.

Personal life
Verkaik is multilingual, speaking Dutch, German and English. She is married to musician Bart van Hoof, a saxophone player.

 Theatre 

 Performances 

 Pfingstgala (Tecklenburg, Openluchttheater, Whit Monday 2006, 2008, 2014 and 2020)
 Concert with Mark Seibert (Stuttgart, Palladium Theater, 26 May 2008)
 Dance Benefit Gala (Hamburg, TUI-Operettenhaus, 29 September 2008)
 Benefit concert with Roberta Valentini (Oberhausen, Metronomtheatre 30 August 2010)
 Simply the Music of Scott Alan (Londen, New Players Theatre, 26 September 2010)
 Backstage with Philippe Ducloux (Essen, hall Lukas, 22 and 23 January 2011)
 Concert with Scott Alan (Hamburger Kammerspiele, 20 June 2011)
 Performance with Jason Robert Brown & Scott Alan (New York, Birdland, 22 August 2011)
 Concert with Alex Melcher (Oberhausen, hall Ebertbad, 31 March 2012)
 Concert with Scott Alan and Friends (New York, Birdland, 30 April 2012)
 As I Am (Scheveningen, Circustheater, 26 June 2012)
 Concert with Patrick Stanke (Hamburg, Stage Club, 10 August 2012)
 Concert with Scott Alan (Amsterdam, M-Lab, 5 November 2012)
 Exclusevening with Willemijn (Utrecht, Boerderij Mereveld, 20 November 2012)
 Concert series Musical & Xmas (Thun, Bern, Switzerland, 12–16 December 2012)
 Concert with Scott Alan (Londen, O2 Arena, 4 August 2013)
 Wow, Here Comes The Girls (Dunstable, The Grove Theatre, 27 April 2014)
 Musicals in Concert (Amsterdam, Ziggo Dome, 15 en 16 November 2014)
 Jesus Christ Superstar in Concert – Maria (Amsterdam, DeLaMar Theater, 16 March 2015)
 Soloconcert (Amsterdam, DeLaMar Theater, 31 mei 2015 en 31 October 2015)
 Soloconcert (London, Ambassadors Theatre, 25 August 2015)
 Soloconcert (New York, 54 Below, 27 & 28 August 2015)
 Musicals in Concert (Amsterdam, Ziggo Dome, 13 & 14 November 2015)
 From Broadway to Breda (Breda, Chassé Theatre, 15 November 2015)
 Exclusevening with Willemijn (De Weistaar, Maarsbergen, 6 June 2016)
 Live in Concert (Cambridge Theatre, London, 31 July 2017)
 Bevrijdingsfestival (Amsterdam, Amstel, 5 May 2018)
 SpaceXperience (Ziggo Dome, Amsterdam, 3 November 2018)
92nd Academy Award Ceremony (Dolby Theatre, Los Angeles, CA, U.S., February 9, 2020)

 Discography 

 Cast recordings 

Jeans 11 (Jeanscompany, 2001)
 Eternity (Orkest Kon. Luchtmacht, 2003)
Drie Musketiers (Three Musketeers) (Joop van den Ende Theaterproducties, 2003) – a DVD was also released
Wicked, German cast recording (Stage Entertainment Germany, 2007)
Frozen, Dutch cast recording (Walt Disney Records, 2014)
 Olaf's Frozen Adventure (Walt Disney Records, 2017)

 Other recordings 

 Musical Gala Ludwigsburg (2008)
Best of Musical Gala 2010, Promo CD from Stage Entertainment Germany (2009)
Musicalballads Unplugged – with Mark Seibert (2010)
 Superstars des Musicals – collection of 3 CDs (2010)
 Scott Alan: What I Wanna Be when I Grow up (2012)
Scott Alan: Live – double CD recorded in Birdland (2012)

 Filmography 

 Awards 

In 2008 and 2010 Verkaik was elected best actress by readers of the German music magazine Da Capo for her portrayal of Elphaba in the German production of Wicked.
In 2009 she was elected best actress by readers of the German music magazine Da Capo for her portrayal of Amneris in the German production of Aïda.
In 2009 and 2010 she won the audience prize from the German magazine Musicals for best musical actress.
In 2010 Verkaik won the voting organised by the site BroadwayisWicked.com where people could vote for the best Elphaba that played in a production of Wicked worldwide. She received 49.9% of a total of 16,705 cast votes.
On 9 January 2012 it was announced that Verkaik again, in a voting organised by BroadwayisWicked.com, was titled Wicked Personality of the Year 2011. She received 55% of a total of 590,000 cast votes.
In May 2012 Verkaik won the Musicalworld Award for "best female lead in a big musical" for the portrayal of Elphaba in the Dutch production of Wicked''.

References

External links

 
 
 
 , "Defying Gravity", Covent Garden market, outside the 2014 Laurence Olivier Awards

1975 births
Living people
Dutch stage actresses
Dutch musical theatre actresses
People from Son en Breugel
People from Nuenen, Gerwen en Nederwetten
German-language singers
Alumni of the Guildford School of Acting
Nationaal Songfestival contestants
20th-century Dutch actresses
20th-century Dutch women singers
21st-century Dutch actresses
21st-century Dutch women singers
21st-century Dutch singers